These are the official results of the Women's 4 × 400 metres event at the 2001 IAAF World Championships in Edmonton, Alberta, Canada.

Medalists

* Runners who participated in the heats only and received medals.

Results

Heats
The first 3 of each heat (Q) plus the 2 fastest times (q) qualify.

Final

References
 Results
 IAAF

 
Relays at the World Athletics Championships
2001 in women's athletics